Naodhar or Nowdher is a village in Bishwanath Upazila, under Sylhet District, Bangladesh. It is divided into three parha/mahalla: Rahman Nagor, Mazparha and Purboparha.

Naodhar is very close to Boiragi Bazar. The Makunda River flows to the north of the village.

The village has four mosques and one primary school.

See also
 List of villages in Bangladesh

References

Bishwanath Upazila
Villages in Sylhet District